Ne quittez pas ! is a French comedy film directed by Arthur Joffé, released in 2004.

Synopsis
Internationally renowned astrophysicist, Félix Mandel, 40, is very attached to the past, to the great despair of his wife, Lucie, who does not know that he is still in contact with the love of his youth, Wendy Lawrence, and does not want him to keep filling his office with souvenirs. One day, fed up with it, she decides on a spring clean, during which she finds an old coat that had belonged to his father, Lucien, dead for two years. After she gives the coat to a tramp, Félix receives a phone call from... Lucien, furious that his son has disposed of the clothing!

Production
 Director : Arthur Joffé 
 Screenplay : Arthur Joffé, from an original story by Arthur Joffé and Guy Zilberstein 
 Director of photography : Philippe Welt 
 Music : Jean-Claude Nachon and Angélique Nachon 
 Year : 2004
 Length : 1h30
 Genre : Comedy
 Filmed : Studio 24

Cast

 Sergio Castellitto : Félix Mandel 
 Michel Serrault : Lucien Mandel (voice only)
 Isabelle Gélinas : Lucie Mandel 
 Rachida Brakni : Yaëlle 
 Dominique Pinon : The tramp 
 László Szabó : The tailor 
 Lisette Malidor : The "black prince" 
 Emily Morgan : Wendy 
 Tchéky Karyo : Raveu, the banker 
 Hélène de Fougerolles : The air hostess
 Maurice Bernart : The rabbin
 Chantal Neuwirth : Aeroplane passenger 
 Jeff Mirza : The London taxi driver 
 Vincent Sgonamillo : Léo 
 Bruno Flender : Jérôme 
 Marc Brunet : Ravier 
 Juliette Joffé : Clotilde  
 Arthur Joffé : The psychoanalyst
 William Alix : Peter 
 Steacy Hazard : Kate 
 Tiffany Dewael : Mona 
 Zinedine Soualem : The neighbour in the hotel 
 Sara Martins : The hotel receptionist
 Claude-Jean Philippe : The client at the newspaper kiosk
 Bruno Lochet : The fellow-prisoner

External links
 
 Ne quittez pas ! at AlloCiné 

French comedy films
2004 films
2000s French-language films
2004 comedy films
Films directed by Arthur Joffé
2000s French films